Harrison Township is one of the fifteen townships of Pickaway County, Ohio, United States.  The 2000 census found 6,424 people in the township, 2,071 of whom lived in the unincorporated portions of the township.

Geography
Located in the northern part of the county, it borders the following townships:
Hamilton Township, Franklin County - north
Madison Township, Franklin County - northeast corner
Madison Township - east
Walnut Township - southeast
Jackson Township - southwest
Scioto Township - west

Two incorporated villages are located in Harrison Township: Ashville in the southeast, and South Bloomfield in the southwest.

Name and history
It is one of nineteen Harrison Townships statewide.

Government
The township is governed by a three-member board of trustees, who are elected in November of odd-numbered years to a four-year term beginning on the following January 1. Two are elected in the year after the presidential election and one is elected in the year before it. There is also an elected township fiscal officer, who serves a four-year term beginning on April 1 of the year after the election, which is held in November of the year before the presidential election. Vacancies in the fiscal officership or on the board of trustees are filled by the remaining trustees.

References

External links
County website

Townships in Pickaway County, Ohio
Townships in Ohio